John Fleming McSweeney Jr. (August 26, 1915 - May 19, 1999) was an American film editor. He was nominated for an Academy Award in the category Best Film Editing for the film Mutiny on the Bounty. McSweeney died in May 1999 of natural causes at his home in Redondo Beach, California, at the age of 83. He was buried in Holy Cross Cemetery.

Selected filmography 
 Mutiny on the Bounty (1962)

References

External links 

1915 births
1999 deaths
People from New York (state)
American film editors
American television editors
Burials at Holy Cross Cemetery, Culver City